Quinone oxidoreductase-like protein 1 is an enzyme that in humans is encoded by the CRYZL1 gene.

This gene encodes a protein that has sequence similarity to zeta crystallin, also known as quinone oxidoreductase. This zeta crystallin-like protein also contains an NAD(P)H binding site. Alternatively spliced transcript variants have been observed but their full-length nature has not been completely determined.

References

External links

Further reading